Mediator of RNA polymerase II transcription subunit 17 is an enzyme that in humans is encoded by the MED17 gene.

The activation of gene transcription is a multistep process that is triggered by factors that recognize transcriptional enhancer sites in DNA. These factors work with co-activators to direct transcriptional initiation by the RNA polymerase II apparatus. The protein encoded by this gene is a subunit of the CRSP (cofactor required for SP1 activation) complex, which, along with TFIID, is required for efficient activation by SP1. This protein is also a component of other multisubunit complexes e.g. thyroid hormone receptor-(TR-) associated proteins which interact with TR and facilitate TR function on DNA templates in conjunction with initiation factors and cofactors.

Interactions
MED17 has been shown to interact with PPARGC1A, Cyclin-dependent kinase 8 and BRCA1.

References

Further reading